KYSN (97.7 FM, "Kissin' 97.7") is a radio station broadcasting a country music format. Licensed to East Wenatchee, Washington, United States, the station serves the Wenatchee area.  The station is currently owned by Townsquare Media and licensed to Townsquare License, LLC and features programming from Premiere Networks and Westwood One.

History
The station went on the air as KTRW on 1980-12-02.  On 1984-07-04, the station changed its call sign to the current KYSN.

Ownership
In June 2006, a deal was reached for KYSN to be acquired by Cherry Creek Radio from Fisher Radio Regional Group as part of a 24 station deal, with a total reported sale price of $33.3 million.

References

External links

YSN
Country radio stations in the United States
Townsquare Media radio stations